Algeria competed at the 2004 Summer Olympics in Athens, Greece from 13 to 29 August 2004. It first competed in the Olympics in 1964, and entered the 2004 Athens Games having won a total of twelve medals — including one gold, one silver, and three bronze medals at the 2000 Summer Olympics. These medals were in athletics (three gold, one silver, two bronze) and boxing (one gold, five bronze). 61 competitors, 46 men and 15 women, took part in 57 events in 10 sports.

Athletics

Algerian athletes have so far achieved qualifying standards in the following athletics events (up to a maximum of 3 athletes in each event at the 'A' Standard, and 1 at the 'B' Standard).

Men
Track & road events

Field events

Women
Track & road events

Field events

Boxing

Fencing

Algeria fielded 8 fencers. All three of the male sabre fencers were defeated in the round of 64, as was the female épéeist. Sofiane el Azizi won his first match in foil, advancing to the round of 32.

Men

Women

Judo

Men

Women

Rowing 

Men

Qualification Legend: FA=Final A (medal); FB=Final B (non-medal); FC=Final C (non-medal); FD=Final D (non-medal); FE=Final E (non-medal); FF=Final F (non-medal); SA/B=Semifinals A/B; SC/D=Semifinals C/D; SE/F=Semifinals E/F; R=Repechage

Swimming 

Men

Women

Table tennis

Tennis

Weightlifting 

Algeria was represented by two weightlifters in Athens. Nafaa Benami, competing in the men's 56 kg class, did not complete the clean and jerk portion of the event.

Wrestling 

Algeria has qualified a single wrestler.

Men's Greco-Roman

See also
 Algeria at the 2005 Mediterranean Games

References

External links
Official Report of the XXVIII Olympiad
Algerian Olympic Committee 

Nations at the 2004 Summer Olympics
2004
Summer Olympics